Miss Teen USA 2004, the 22nd Miss Teen USA pageant, was televised live from Palm Springs Convention Center, Palm Springs on August 6, 2004. At the conclusion of the final competition, Miss Louisiana Teen USA Shelley Hennig was crowned by outgoing queen Tami Farrell of Oregon.

Prior to the live telecast, the 51 contestants competed in a preliminary presentation show where they were judged in swimsuits and evening gowns. Scores from this judging determined the top 15 for the final competition.

All the delegates were first required to win their state pageant, which in some states also meant holding a local title.

Results

Placements

Awards

Delegates
The Miss Teen USA 2004 delegates were:

Crossovers
Nine contestants later won Miss America, Miss USA state titles, or Miss Universe national titles:
Carissa Kelley (Kansas) - Miss Kansas 2011
Sarah French (Arkansas) - Miss Missouri 2006
Nicole White (District of Columbia) - Miss District of Columbia USA 2009
Anastagia Pierre (Florida) - Miss Florida USA 2009 and Miss Bahamas Universe 2011.
Courtni Hall (Indiana) - Miss Indiana USA 2009
Jessica McRaney (Mississippi) - Miss Mississippi USA 2009
Meagan Winings (Nebraska) - Miss Nebraska USA 2009
Helen Salas (Nevada) - Miss Nevada USA 2007 (4th runner-up), assumed the Miss Nevada USA title after Katie Rees dethroned due to controversial past
Magen Ellis (Texas) - Miss Texas USA 2007 (top 10)

Judges
Jonathan Antin
Rachel Boston
Alisha Davis
John Ferriter
Shauna Gambill
Carolyn Kepcher
Caryle Nabers
Scott Steindorff
Alison Sweeney
Jorge Ramon

External links
Official website

2004
2004 beauty pageants
2004 in the United States
2004 in California